Meje may refer to:

People
 Noluthando Meje (born 1986), South African actress and singer

Places
 Meje, Cirkulane, Slovenia
 Mejë, Kosovo

Other
 Meje or Mangbetu language